There is also a town called Vágur on Suðuroy.

Sørvágur is a village on the island of Vágar in the Faroe Islands.

It is located at the landward end of Sørvágsfjørður. Sørvágur is the largest village in Sørvágur Municipality.

Name
The name Sørvágur translates to "The Bay of Sør". While the second half of the name makes sense given the fact that the village is located at a bay, the first half is more mysterious. Legend has it that the first man to settle at this place was called 'Sørli' and hence the village was named in honour of him. Another explanation on the origin of 'Sør' comes from the old-Norse 'Seyr' which is a word for sand (seyr is also a word for foggy rain). Sørvágur has quite a large sandbeach in comparison with other Faroese villages and towns, and therefore it was speculated that the original name of Sørvágur was Seyrvágur, and during the course of time, Seyrvágur became Sørvágur. During the first half of the 20th century local people in Sørvágur tried to correct this historical injustice and used the name Seyrvágur instead of Sørvágur. However, this trend died out again. One reason may be that there is no proof in the Faroese historical records that justifies the name Seyrvágur.

As of today (2005) nobody has come up with at reasonable explanation to the origin of the name Sørvágur.

First settlement
Sørvágur is considered to be one of the oldest villages in the Faroe Islands. In 1957 the locals decided to build a new school, and during the preparations to build the schools gymnastic hall they excavated an old Viking settlement. Sørvágur – alongside Leirvík, Tjørnuvík and Sandur – is in one of the few places in the Faroe Islands where archaeologists have been able to find substantial proof that these places were built during the first 100–150 years after the Faroese Landnám in 825.

Even though the village is old, there is no mention of it, or the island of Vágoy, in the old Faeringa Saga from the thirteenth century.

History

Between the years of 1200 and 1400 the village moved from its first settlements alongside the river Hanusará and further south between the rivers of Stórá and Kirkjuá. Historical records from 17th century show, that the original settlement alongside Hanusará was abandoned, and the village was moved firmly to the new location between the two main rivers in Sørvág. The main reason for this was probably that the weather conditions between the two rivers are far superior to other places in Sørvág.

The first written record regarding Sørvág is from 1584. The record shows that there were only three small farms in Sørvág at that time. This coincides very well with the fact, that the land belonging to Sørvág is divided into three parts: Suðurtriðingur, Norðurtriðingur and Úttriðingur.

From the 15th century to the late 17th century the Norwegian nobles the  Benkenstock family owned all the land in Sørvág. Around 1665 a Dane – Severin Fohrman – bought all the land from the Benkenstock's and immediately started to sell it back to the locals. This meant that almost all the land in Sørvág is private property (óðalsjørð) instead of belonging to the king (kongsjørð).

Using the "Land Books" (Jarðarbøkur) it is speculated, that the number of inhabitants in Sørvág in the 17th century was around fifty. In the first census in the Faroes in 1801 the number of inhabitants in Sørvág had risen to a mere 86. In 1855 the number of inhabitants was 163. The reason for this slow progress is due to the special requirements for marriage, that were law in the Faroes. The law said, that in order to marry you would need to own land or have demonstrated that you were a faithful servant to someone who owned land. It was only the wealthy farmers who had a substantial amount of land, and therefore the birthrate in the Faroes was very low until this law was abolished.

During the feudal period, it was only the big farmers who had a fishing boat. The first person in the Faroes, who did not own any land, and got his own fishing boat, came from Sørvág. His name was Gamli Dávur.

During the Sloop period Sørvágur had many sloops.

The church in Sørvágur is from 1886.

The first fish factory in the Faroe Islands was built in Sørvágur in 1952.

The locals from Sørvágur formed a part of the backbone of fishermen, who went to Greenland to fish. Faroese fishermen were instrumental in teaching the inhabitants of Greenland to do deepsea fishing.

In the period 1902–1912, there was a whaling station in the nearby bay of Selvík

World War II
During World War II Sørvágur was home to the British Royal Engineers, who lived at Uppi á Mýrum. They built all the main infrastructure in Sørvágur including Vágar Airport, the harbour in Sørvág, Niðaraveg (the main road to the harbour) and several bridges. To accomplish this they had to move entire houses to other locations.

Geography and landmarks

Districts (býlingar) in Sørvág:

Climate
Vágar has colder and snowier winters than most other places in the archipelago. Lower temperatures combined with higher precipitation are responsible for this, and measurable snow cover can be seen- a rarity in the Faroe Islands, in which snow cover (in areas which regularly experience it) is usually limited to a thin coating. The airport, at which data is recorded, is also located at a higher altitude on the island (84 meters above sea level), which might result in lower temperatures and higher precipitation than lower-lying areas on the island. Frost occurs on average on 62 days of the year, the most out of all stations included in the records of the Danish Meteorological Institute.

See also:
List of districts in Sørvág

Small and big rivers in Sørvág (note: rivers in the Faroe Islands may be considered a mere stream in other places):
Breiðá
Tunguliðsá
Hanusará
Kirkjuá
Stórá
Skipá

Mountains surrounding Sørvág:

Vørðufelli
Líðarnøva
Skeiðin
Nónfjall
Høgafjall
Bólafløttur

Valleys in and around Sørvág:

Húsadalur
Kjóvadalur

Major bays:

Selvík

Other landmarks:

Middagsvarði
Vesturvarði
Norðurvarði
Seyðagarðar

Industry

Fishery

Sørvágur has always been a place where fishery has been very dominant. In older times it was said, that the only thing necessary for survival in Sørvágur was that you had a fishing rod and a pot to cook the fish. The fishing industry also plays a vital role in the industrial environment in Sørvágur today (2005). Today there is a modern fish factory producing mainly salt fish; a fish farm raising salmon; one fish market; one major fish factory ship, which produces fish directly to the British market; 6 smaller fishing trawlers and 50+ small fishing boats.

Airport
The Vágar Airport is the only airport on the Faroe Islands, and it is located just outside Sørvágur. Many residents of Sørvágur work there.

Shops and colonials
After the Royal Monopoly trade over the Faroe Islands ended in 1856, everyone was able to start trading on their own. This led to an upsurge in colonial shops opening all over the place. In Sørvágur many colonials were started and one of the leading concerns on the Faroe Islands - Niclasen - was started in Sørvágur. During the transformation of the Faroese society from a feudal to a semi-industrial these concerns played a major role in ensuring labour to the common man. The main colonial in Sørvágur - Norði Stovu handilin - was originally started by the Niclasen concern. The other colonial - Løðuhandilin - was started by the rival concern in Sørvágur - Rasmussen. These two colonials are the only two remaining in Sørvágur today (2005).
Norði Stovu handilin is better known under the name Hjá Valdemar and today it also contains a bakery.

At the harbour in Sørvágur lies a hardware store - Hjá Niclasen - which also used to form a part of the Niclasen concern. Also placed in the proximity of the harbour lies a Statoil tank station which is run by the Niclasen concern. The tank station also includes a kiosk and grill.

Other shops in Sørvágur:

Hjá Sannu - Childrenwear, lingerie and cosmetics.
Gávubúðin Kurvin - Giftshop
Sørvágs ursmiða - Optics
Sørvágs skósøla - Shoestore
Cafe 62°N - Cafe/grill (at Vagar Airport)
Gávubúðin Prýði - Giftshop (at Vagar Airport)

Banks

The faroese banks Føroya Banki and Eik Banki are present in Sørvágur. There are two automatic teller machines, one at Vágar Airport and the other at Eik Banki.

Tourists

In close proximity to the airport lies a hotel with restaurant - Hotel Vágar. The hotel is a modern 3 star hotel.
During the summer tourist are able to make excursions in boats from Sørvágur . Tourists are also able to make excursions  on Sørvágsvatn.
There is a local museum is in Sørvágur and a small art gallery

Public

There is a daycare institution in Sørvágur
A post office is in Sørvágur

Other

A blacksmith is located at the harbour
Individual carpenters are present in Sørvágur
Sørvágur was once the home village of various members of the ambient indie band Sepals In The Outer Whorl.

Sport and other activities

Sport
The local sport association of Sørvágur is called SÍ. They compete mainly in football and volleyball. The football club of Sørvágur has merged with the club from other villages on the island into the football club 07 Vestur.

There has also been an association for Faroese rowing called SR.

There used to be a chess club called Rókur, but it died out during the 1960s.

Religion

Religion plays a great role in the day-to-day life in Sørvágur. There are two main buildings – apart from the church – housing two different religious denominations: Libanon houses the Protestant Heimamissiónin, and Kedron houses the Brethren/baptist Brøðrasamkoman.

Literature
Sonni Jacobsen: Sørvágur og sørvingar. Sørvágur: Forlagið Ytstifjórðingur 1995–1996. (2 vol.)
Abstract from vol. 1 (Faroese)
Abstract from vol. 2 (Faroese)

See also
List of towns in the Faroe Islands

References

External links

http://www.faroeislands.dk/pages/SorvagurIndex.htm Images from Sørvágur
http://www.sorvag.fo/ Official website for the municipality of Sørvágur (Faroese)
https://web.archive.org/web/20050407182656/http://www.sis.fo/ The Sport Association of Sørvágur (Faroese)
https://web.archive.org/web/20050217191636/http://kort.fo/website/sorkom/viewer.htm Online map of the municipality of Sørvág
https://web.archive.org/web/20050204055608/http://www.portal.fo/cam/webcam.php?kamera=92 Live web-cam from Sørvágur

 
Populated places in the Faroe Islands
Vágar
Fishing communities
Ports and harbours of the Faroe Islands